The 1948 Ottawa Rough Riders finished in 1st place in the Interprovincial Rugby Football Union with a 10–2 record but lost the Grey Cup game to the Calgary Stampeders.

Preseason

Regular season

Standings

Schedule

Postseason

Playoffs

Grey Cup

References

Ottawa Rough Riders seasons
James S. Dixon Trophy championship seasons
1948 Canadian football season by team